Joseph Daniel Fontenot (born March 20, 1977) is a former Major League Baseball player. Fontenot pitched in eight games for the Florida Marlins in the 1998 season. He had an 0–7 record with eight games started, and a 6.33 ERA.

External links

Baseball-Almanac page

1977 births
Living people
People from Scott, Louisiana
Florida Marlins players
Baseball players from Louisiana
Charlotte Knights players
Bellingham Giants players
Calgary Cannons players
Portland Sea Dogs players
San Jose Giants players
Shreveport Captains players